Party of the French Union of Ivory Coast (PUFCI) was a political party in colonial Ivory Coast. PUFCI was formed in 1951 through the merger of the Progressive Party of Ivory Coast (PPCI) and Entente of Independents of Ivory Coast (EDICI). The administrative secretary of PUFCI was Vamé Doumouya.

Sources
Gbagbo, Laurent: Côte d'Ivoire, Pour une alternative démocratique. Paris: L'Harmattan, 1983.

Defunct political parties in Ivory Coast
Political parties in French West Africa
1951 establishments in Ivory Coast
Political parties established in 1951